In mathematics, geology, and cartography, a surface map is a 2D perspective representation of a 3-dimensional surface.

Surface maps usually represent real-world entities such as landforms or the surfaces of objects. They can, however, serve as an abstraction where the third, or even all of the dimensions correspond to non-spatial data.  In this capacity they act more as graphs than maps.

Maps